Milena Agus (born 1959) is an Italian author from Sardinia. She is one of the leading novelists in the so-called Sardinian Literary Spring which began in the 1980s and which includes other international names such as Michela Murgia.

Biography
Milena Agus was born in Genova to Sardinian parents.  She lives and works in Cagliari, where she teaches Italian and History at the Liceo Artistico e Musicale "Foiso Fois" in Cagliari, a creative school. She is a practitioner of the 'New Sardinian Literature'.

Her first novel, While the Shark is Sleeping (Nottetempo, 2005) had two reprints within as many months, but it was Mal di Pietre (From the Land of the Moon in English) which brought her to the attention of a wide audience. Translated into five languages, it was a bestseller in France, where it rose to international fame. Mal di Pietre was a finalist for the Strega prize, the Campiello prize, and the Stresa di Narrativa prize. In 2016 it was adapted into a feature film called Mal de Pierres, or in English From the Land of the Moon  directed by Nicole Garcia and starring Marion Cotillard. It was entered into competition at the Cannes Film Festival in May 2016.

Works

While the Shark is Sleeping, Rome, Nottetempo, 2005
From the Land of the Moon, Rome, Nottetempo, 2006
Perché scrivere, Rome, Nottetempo, 2007
Scrivere è una tana. La Sardegna pure, in AA. VV. (Edited by Giulio Angioni), Cartas de logu: scrittori sardi allo specchio, Cagliari, CUEC, 2007
The Neighbour, Cagliari, Tiligù, 2008
Ali di Babbo, Roma, Nottetempo, 2008
La Contessa di Ricotta, Roma, Nottetempo, 2009
Nascosto al giorno. Il piacere di leggere e di scrivere, (con Ettore Cannas), Cagliari, Tiligù, 2010
Sottosopra, Rome, Nottetempo, 2011
Guardati dalla mia Fame (with Luciana Castellina), Nottetempo, 2014

Works in English  
 The house in via Manno Carlton North, Vic. : Scribe Publications, 2009. 
 Daddy's wings translator Brigid Maher, Melbourne : Scribe, 2011.  
 While the shark is sleeping, translator Brigid Maher, Publisher:	London : Telegram, 2014.

Prizes
Junturus Prize 2004, for Mal di Pietre
Relay Prize («roman d'évasion») in France
Forte Village Prize 2007
Campiello Prize, Jury's special selection 2007
Santa Marinella Peize 2007
Elsa Morante Prize 2007
Zerilli-Marimo Prize for Italian Fiction, New York 2008, for Mal di Pietre

References

External links
Italian Encyclopoedia of Women
Non Solo Gialli, Corriere della Sera article 2007
Scribe Australia, Milena Agus Author Page

Italian women novelists
Italian educators
21st-century Italian novelists
Living people
Sardinian culture
1959 births
People from Cagliari
21st-century Italian women writers
Sardinian women
Writers from Sardinia